Dakshin Baguan is a census town in Tamluk CD Block in Purba Medinipur district  in the state of West Bengal, India.

Geography

Location

Urbanisation
94.08% of the population of Tamluk subdivision live in the rural areas. Only 5.92% of the population live in the urban areas, and that is the second lowest proportion of urban population amongst the four subdivisions in Purba Medinipur district, just above Egra subdivision.

Note: The map alongside presents some of the notable locations in the subdivision. All places marked in the map are linked in the larger full screen map.

Demographics
As per 2011 Census of India Dakshin Baguan had a total population of 5,180 of which 2,705 (52%) were males and 2,475 (48%) were females. Population below 6 years was 696. The total number of literates in Dakshin Baguan was 4,074 (90.86% of the population over 6 years).

Infrastructure
As per the District Census Handbook 2011, Dakshin Baguan covered an area of 0.64 km2. It had bus routes in the town. Amongst the civic amenities it had 50 road light points and 900 domestic electric connections. Amongst the medical facilities it had 4 nursing homes with 40 beds and 15 medicine shops in the town. Amongst the educational facilities it had were 4 primary schools, 1 middle school, 1 secondary school and 1 senior secondary school in the town. The nearest degree college was at Tamluk 12 km away. Amongst the recreational and cultural facilities a cinema theatre was there at Radhamani 5 km away and an auditorium/ community hall was there in the town.

Transport
Dakshin Baguan is on State Highway 4.

Education
Chanserpur High School, PO Chanserpur, is a Bengali-medium boys only higher secondary school, established in 1914. It has arrangements for teaching from class VI to XII. It has a library and a play ground.

Ananatapur Bani Niketan Girls High School is a girls only higher secondary school affiliated to the West Bengal Council of Higher Secondary Education.

Healthcare
Anantapur Rural Hospital at Anantapur, PO Chanserpur (with 30 beds) is the main medical facility in Tamluk CD block.

References

Cities and towns in Purba Medinipur district